Juan Castañeda (born 18 October 1980) is a Spanish épée fencer.

Castañeda won the silver medal in the épée team event at the 2006 World Fencing Championships after losing to France in the final. He accomplished this with his team mates Ignacio Canto, José Luis Abajo and Eduardo Sepulveda Puerto.

Achievements
 2006 World Fencing Championships, team épée

References

1980 births
Living people
Spanish male épée fencers
Place of birth missing (living people)